Heald College (1863 –2015) was a private for-profit businesscareer college with its main campus in San Francisco, California. It offered courses in the fields of healthcare, business, legal, and technology.

Beginning in 2012, it also offered full online degrees. Heald College was owned by Corinthian Colleges, a for-profit education company that also operated Everest College and WyoTech. Heald College closed for good when Corinthian Colleges shuttered all of their campuses on April 27, 2015. At the time of its closure, the college had campuses in twelve cities, in addition to its online program.

History

The college was founded in San Francisco, California, by Edward Payson Heald, on August 8, 1863, and known for many years as "Heald's Business College".

In 1875, due to demand for training in mining and civil engineering, Heald created “The School of Engineering and Mining” located at 425 McAllister Street. In 1913 the McAllister Street location was purchased by the City of San Francisco to become the new City Hall. At that time Heald moved the school into a new building at Van Ness and Post where it remained until August 1983, when the Engineering College Division was closed, and the Heald Technical Division was relocated to a new facility at Yerba Buena West.

In 2001, it changed its name from Heald Colleges to Heald College. In 2007, the then non-profit institution was acquired by a private investor group and turned into a for-profit college.

In November 2009, Corinthian Colleges, Inc. purchased Heald College's parent company for $395 million, simultaneously announcing plans to begin in 2011 offering online-only courses leading to degree programs based entirely on online coursework. However, Corinthian planned to retain the Heald name, as well as its faculty and staff.

In 2015, due to findings by the Department of Education of misrepresented job placement rates in certain programs at Corinthian Colleges, including Heald, after July 2010, the department made students of these programs eligible to have their debts cancelled if they submitted an attestation form. Corinthian was assessed a fine of $30 million, and shut down all its campuses, including Heald, on April 27, 2015.

Corinthian had sold some of its campuses. At the time of closure, in addition to its online program, Heald had campuses in Hawaii, Oregon, and ten locations in California:

Accreditation
From 1983 until its closure, Heald College was accredited by the Accrediting Commission for Community and Junior Colleges of the Western Association of Schools and Colleges (WASC). Heald offered Associate in Applied Sciences degrees and Associate of Arts degrees, diplomas or certificates.

In addition, in July 2012, Heald College received accreditation from the Western Associate of Schools and Colleges accrediting commission for Senior Colleges and Universities (WASC Sr.).

Notable alumni

 A.P. Giannini (1870–1949), banker, founder of Transamerica and the Bank of Italy and co-founder/co-creator of Bank of America.
 George Christopher (1907–2000), former Mayor of San Francisco.
Victor Jules "Trader Vic" Bergeron (1902–1984), restaurateur.
 Michael Henry de Young (1849–1925), San Francisco Chronicle newspaper publisher and museum founder.
Oliver Gagliani (1917–2002), photographer.
 William Gorham (1888–1949), businessman, engineer at Hitachi during World War II, contributing to founding of Nissan.
Fred Swanton (1862–1940) former mayor of Santa Cruz, California, and founder of Santa Cruz Beach Boardwalk.
Edward Keating Strobridge (1869-1946) California state assemblyman from 1907 to 1909, then state senator for eight years. After that, he worked for Alameda County as the “sealer of weights and measures” for 27 year. Stepson of James Harvey Strobridge.
Julius Fried (1872-1958), oil promoter and discoverer of the Lakeview Gusher

References

External links
 

1863 establishments in California
2015 disestablishments in California
Corinthian Colleges
Educational institutions established in 1863
Educational institutions disestablished in 2015
Former for-profit universities and colleges in the United States
Schools accredited by the Western Association of Schools and Colleges
Universities and colleges in San Francisco